The R. Wayne Estopinal College of Architecture and Planning, also known as CAP, is an academic college of Ball State University in Muncie, Indiana offering degrees in Architecture, Landscape Architecture, Urban Planning, Historic Preservation, Urban Design, Construction Management, and Interior Design, and is Indiana's only state-assisted Architecture school.

On June 12, 2019, the Ball State University Board of Trustees approved renaming the College of Architecture and Planning in honor of alumnus R. Wayne Estopinal, who served on the university's board of trustees from 2011 until his death in 2018.

History
In the mid-1960s, the Indiana General Assembly approved the development of a state-assisted architecture program at what was then Ball State Teacher's College. On March 23, 1965, the basis of the College of Architecture and Planning opened its doors in a converted reserve naval armory just north of the site of the current CAP building. CAP began with four instructors and only offered degrees in Architecture. In 1972, the west portion of the existing building was built, and an addition was added in 1980.

First Year Program
At the College of Architecture and Planning, all entry-level students are subjected to common course of study. Students entering the First Year Program will take classes introducing the professions in Architecture, Landscape Architecture and Urban Planning. Students will also have to take four courses: two design studios and two design communication media classes. CAP 101 and CAP 102 are design studio courses to introduce environmental design and planning. CAP 161 and CAP 162 are design media courses which develop students' communication of ideas through diagramming, illustrating and other forms of media. Depending on when a student begins his/her CAP 101 and 161 classes, the student will either be a Farchy, Sparchy or AEP. These names originated by students: Farchys begin their design classes in the fall, Sparchys in the spring, and AEP (Accelerated Entry Program) have their design classes over summer sessions.
The first class of 32 students graduated in 1971.

Ranking and Recognitions

Architecture, landscape architecture, and urban planning are blended in a design college, and Ball State is unique in providing studios for urban planning.
Several CAP faculty members have been named fellows, presidents, officers, or board members of national professional organizations.

Architecture
The Department of Architecture was ranked among the nation's top 15 architecture programs in the 2003 Almanac of Architecture and Design. The rankings were based on the hiring experiences of leading U.S. architecture firms, which cited programs that produced the most professional, best-prepared graduates over the past five years.
Ball State was cited as a national model for architecture education and practice in a special report by the Carnegie Foundation for the Advancement of Teaching.
Ball State is a three-time winner of the American Institute of Architects (AIA) Education Honor Award
Community-Based Projects earned a national Community Design Program Award from the Association of Collegiate Schools of Architecture for combining "in-the-field" education with public service.

Landscape Architecture
In its 2009 edition of "America's Best Architecture & Design Schools", the journal DesignIntelligence ranked Ball State's undergraduate landscape architecture program eighth in the nation and its graduate landscape architecture program fifth.
The 2007 edition of "America's Best Architecture and Design Schools" named Malcolm Cairns, FASLA, Professor of Landscape Architecture, and past Chair of the Landscape Architecture, as one of the 2007 landscape architecture educators of the year.
Urban Planning
The Muncie Urban Design Studio became the only university-based studio featured in a national online catalog of affordable housing designs, and MUDS has shared Indiana's top preservation award.
Planetizen 2007 Guide to Graduate Urban Planning Programs ranked Ball State's Historic Preservation 7th among other preservation degrees.
Planetizen 2007 Guide to Graduate Urban Planning Programs ranked Ball State's Urban Planning program 17th nationwide

Extensions

CAP:IC
In 2001 the College of Architecture and Planning opened the Indianapolis Center (CAP:IC), a university-based design center, in downtown Indianapolis.  The Center provides immersive learning opportunities for students while working on community projects.  The main goal of the center is to help change and recover urban spaces and to make models for sustainable urban life. It is home to the University's Master of Urban Design and Graduate Certificate in Real Estate Development programs.  In 2006 CAP:IC became a partner in the larger Ball State Indianapolis Center. In 2016, CAP moved out of Ball State University's Indianapolis Center in order to have more space and better access to partners at their new location in the Platform across from the City-County Building (housing offices of the Mayor, DMD, and other City departments). The new space is called the CAP: INDY Connector in light of its mission to develop, support, and sustain connections between College students, faculty, and alumni with professionals, firms, and organizations throughout the City of Indianapolis.

Major Events
 Regional Session of the Mayors' Institute on City Design, 2017
 National AIA Leadership Institute, Regional Venue, 2016

CAP:IC Projects
East Washington Street Vision Plan
Indianapolis Regional Center Design Guidelines
Speedway Speedzone Development - Development for the areas just south of the Indianapolis Speedway
Historic Meridian Park Neighborhood Workshop
Alice Carter Place Park
Herron Resuse Study
Historic Irvington Neighborhood Plan
UNWA Neighborhood Plan
Central State Reuse Study
Indianapolis Regional Center Plan 2020

Awards
NUVO Cultural Vision Award, NUVO Newsweekly, 2004
Digital Education Achievement Award, Center for Digital Education, 2004
Hoosier Planning Award, Indiana Chapter of the American Planning Association, 2009
National Planning Award, American Planning Association, 2010

CAP Asia
CAP Asia is a ten-week field-study that is offered during spring semester of every other year.  Graduate and undergraduate students travel extensively through many South Asia countries and cities working "hand in hand with local schools, professionals, and educators" on collaborative projects rooted in both design and planning.  Nihal Perera is the director for this program.  The program is made possible through Ball State University's Immersive Learning initiative that was implemented by former University President JoAnn Gora.

CAP World Tour

Notable alumni
Craig Hartman, Partner at Skidmore, Owings and Merrill
Troy Thompson, Managing Partner at SmithGroup
Brandon Welling, Managing Partner at Morphosis Architects

References

Architecture schools in Indiana
Ball State University
Education in Delaware County, Indiana
Educational institutions established in 1965
1965 establishments in Indiana